"Release Me" (sometimes rendered as "Release Me (and Let Me Love Again)"), is a popular song written by Eddie "Piano" Miller and Robert Yount in 1949. Four years later it was recorded by Jimmy Heap & the Melody Masters (in 1953), and with even better success by Patti Page (1954), Ray Price (1954), and Kitty Wells (1954). Jivin' Gene [Bourgeois] & the Jokers recorded the tune in 1960, and that version served as an inspiration for Little Esther Phillips, who reached number one on the R&B chart and number eight on the pop chart with her big-selling cover. The Everly Brothers followed in 1963, along with Lucille Starr including a translation in French (1964), Jerry Wallace (1966), Dean Martin (1967), Engelbert Humperdinck (1967) who was number one on the UK Singles Chart  and many others in the years after such as Jewels Renauld (2022).

Engelbert Humperdinck’s version of “Release Me” has the distinction of holding the number one slot on the chart in the UK for six weeks during March and April 1967, and preventing the Beatles' "Penny Lane" / "Strawberry Fields Forever" from reaching the top spot. Humperdinck's "Release Me" was also the highest selling single of 1967 in the UK, recording over one million in sales. Actual sales stand at 1.38 million copies.

Writing credits 
Although Miller later claimed to have written the song in 1946—only being able to record it himself in 1949—he actually co-wrote it with Robert Yount in 1949. As they were working at that time with Dub Williams, a pseudonym of James Pebworth, they gave him one-third of the song. The song was released with the writing credited to Miller-Williams-Gene, as Yount was using his stage name of Bobby Gene.

Although owner of Four Star Records William McCall would usually add his pseudonym "W.S. Stevenson" to the credit of songs he published, he failed to do so in 1949. However, in 1957, Miller and Yount entered into a new publishing agreement with Four Star Records, in which "W.S. Stevenson" replaced Williams as co-writer.

Yount signed away his royalty rights to William McCall in 1958, after which the credits to the song officially became "Miller-Stevenson", although multiple variations also existed. For example, Engelbert Humperdinck's United Kingdom 45 is credited to Eddie Miller, Robert Yount, Dub Williams and Robert Harris. The Harris credit, however, turned out to be another pseudonym for James Pebworth (along with Dub Williams).

With the bankruptcy of Four Star’s successor in interest, the copyright to the song was acquired by Acuff-Rose Music. When the initial term of copyright ended in 1983, it was renewed for a second term. Between 1983 and 1985 Acuff-Rose paid royalties to Yount, until they were notified by the family of the deceased William McCall of the 1958 assignment. Acuff-Rose then suspended payments until the dispute between the claimants was resolved. On December 24, 1996 the United States Courts of Appeals, Ninth Circuit, upheld the claim of the McCalls.

In country music

In country music, "Release Me" became a hit for Jimmy Heap, Kitty Wells, and Ray Price, all in 1954. Even though Price had several major hits beforehand, "Release Me" is sometimes considered his breakthrough hit. The song had elements of the  shuffle, Price's signature sound that would become more evident on future successes such as "Crazy Arms."

Price's version was part of a double-A sided hit, paired with another song that introduced fans to the  shuffle: "I'll Be There (If You Ever Want Me)" Both sides went on to become major hits for Price, with "Release Me" peaking at No. 6 and "I'll Be There" stopping at No. 2.

Engelbert Humperdinck version

In 1965, Humperdinck, who at the time was performing under the name of Gerry Dorsey, met up again with an old friend of his, Gordon Mills. By that time Mills was successfully managing Tom Jones. Mills added Dorsey to his management roster and changed his name. As Humperdinck, the singer released a couple of near misses in the UK although one song, "Dommage, Dommage", was successful in Europe.

Early in 1967, Humperdinck was asked to stand in for Dickie Valentine, who was ill, on Sunday Night at the London Palladium, a TV variety show that was one of the highest-rating programs in the UK at the time. He sang "Release Me" on the show. It reached number one in the UK Singles Chart on 2 March and stayed there for six weeks, keeping "Penny Lane" / "Strawberry Fields Forever" by the Beatles off the top spot, the first time the Beatles had not reached the top since their debut single. Humperdinck's recording stayed in the charts for a record fifty-six consecutive weeks.

The B-side, "Ten Guitars", became a surprise hit in New Zealand among young Maori moving to the cities for work, and, not long after, the wider New Zealand music scene as well. 'Ten Guitars' later served as the name for a documentary on New Zealand popular music.

Chart performance

Other versions
Ray Price (1954)
Kitty Wells (1954)
Jimmy Heap (1954)
Jerry Lee Lewis (1958)
Lefty Frizzell (1959)
Wilburn Brothers (1962) (album City Limits)
Little Esther Phillips (1962)
Bobby Darin (1963)
Everly Brothers (1963) (album Sing Great Country Hits)
Cindy Malone (1963)
Billy Vaughn (1963)
The Orlons (1963) (album All The Hits)
Lucille Starr (1964) 
Jerry Wallace (1966)
Dean Martin (1967)
Engelbert Humperdinck (1967)
Matt Monro (1967)
Los Quandos (1967) (in Spanish with the title "Sueltame")
John Vance Sound (1967)
Floyd Cramer (1967) (album Class of '67)
Johnny Adams (1968)
Earl Grant (1968)
Patti Page (1968, 1998)
Dolly Parton (1968)
Johnny Paycheck (1968) 
Clifton Chenier (1969)
Jerry Lee Lewis (1969)
Toni Williams (1969)
John Holt (1970s)
Elvis Presley (1970)
Roger Ruskin Spear (1971)
Victor Wood (1971) (album Mr. Lonely)
Loretta Lynn/Conway Twitty (1973)
Charlie McCoy (1973)
Johnny Rodriguez (1973)
The Bonzo Dog Doo-Dah Band (1974)
Yvette Horner (1977)
Madness (1980, 1986)
Dolly Parton (1982)
(Credited to), "Stumpus Maximus & The Good Ol' Boys" (1989), however the contributors are actually Def Leppard backing their future tour manager Malvin Mortimer; the cover is a parody and starts out as an exaggerated pub-singer version of the opening verses, becoming more and more extreme as the song progresses. In the last verse, Stumpus' histrionics are interrupted by a brief belch, followed by a polite "'scuse me" before going back up to eleven.
The Mike Flowers Pops, another parody. (1996)
Junior Kimbrough (2002)
Akira Kobayashi & Four Beat Paradise (2005)
George Canyon (2007)
Jerry Lee Lewis with Gillian Welch (2010)
Alexander Stenerud (2010 on the Norwegian show: Beat for Beat)
Tokyo Jihen (2010 ULTRA C Live Tour, lead vocals by Ukigumo)
Lyle Lovett (duet with k.d. lang (2012) in album Release Me)

In popular culture
In 1994, an instrumental version of the song was adopted as the theme music to British sketch show The Fast Show.  One sketch also featured a performance of the song by comedian Paul Whitehouse as character Kenny Valentine.

In 1997 it featured in an Irish advert for Jacob's Cream Cracker's.

The Engelbert Humperdinck recording was featured in the episode "Going to Pot" of the 1970s British sitcom The Good Life.

British journalist and author Peter Hitchens has described Humperdinck's hugely successful version as "the real revolutionary anthem of the Sixties" and "far more influential than Bob Dylan", drawing a comparison between the song's lyrics and the desire of the public to be released from the social conservatism that had prevailed in society until the 1960s.

The Johnny Adams version of the song was used in the 2009 film Bad Lieutenant: Port of Call New Orleans in a POV shot of iguanas on a coffee table.

In 2013, the song was recorded by the New Zealand trio Sol3 Mio for their debut album Sol3 Mio.

References

External links
BBC Interview with Engelbert Humperdinck

1949 songs
1954 singles
1962 singles
1967 singles
Engelbert Humperdinck songs
UK Singles Chart number-one singles
Irish Singles Chart number-one singles
Songs written by Eddie Miller (songwriter)
Schlager songs
Ray Price (musician) songs
Kitty Wells songs
Johnny Adams songs
Madness (band) songs
Song recordings produced by Don Law
Songs about divorce